Emeka Jude Ezeonu (born 13 September 1991) is a Nigerian international football player and features for Ifeanyi Ubah FC Nigeria. Victoria University Sports Club Uganda. Victors FC Uganda. Kilis Belediyespor Turkey. Sakıcı İnşaat Şenyurtspor Turkey. Corluspor Turkey. Ezinespor Turkey. Asaği Kirazca Spor Turkey. Batman Gercüs Baglarspor Turkey. as a forward. He last featured at. Fc Eintracht Landshut Germany. Barkas Tolkmicko fc Poland. Spvgg Patersdorf Germany.

Life and career
Emeka Jude Ezeonu began his football career in Ifeanyi Ubah F.C. in Nigeria before he moved to Uganda where he signed with SCVU Victoria University in 2012. Following the conclusion of the 2013 season, Ezeonu was transferred to Victors FC, after the season he moved to Turkey and was signed by Kilis belediyespor where he made 2 appearances and scored a goal in is first game in the year 2014, he was loaned to Senyurtspor in the half season he made 9 appearances in 2015 before he was transferred to Çorluspor, after the year 2016 he was signed by Ezinespor where he made a great impact and was transferred to Asaği Kirazcaspor in 2017 the season he moved to  Batman Gercüs Baglarspor in the half season, 
then transferred to Vizespor in 2018 where he helped the club gain promotion to the Turkish Bal league in 2019.

Ezeonu had a successful stint at Senyurtspor from 2015–16. At the end of the season, he joined Corluspor.

Ezeonu joined at Ezinespor from 2016–17 season, he played 25 matches and 3 goals, 15 assists.

References

External links
 
 {{https://www.fupa.net/player/emeka-jude-ezeonu-1851658
https://www.bfv.de/spieler/emeka-ezeonu/029SHMUBHO000000VS5489B6VVVL3484
Mackolik player|367569}}

1991 births
Living people
Nigerian expatriate footballers
SC Victoria University players
Association football forwards
Ifeanyi Ubah F.C. players